Fifteen ships of the Royal Navy have been named HMS Enterprise (or HMS Enterprize) while another was planned:

  was a 24-gun sixth rate, previously the French frigate , captured in May 1705.  She was wrecked in October 1707.
  was a 44-gun fifth rate launched in 1709. She underwent a great repair in 1718–19, was hulked in 1740 and fitted as a hospital ship in 1745 before being sold in 1749.
 , a 44-gun frigate, was to have been named Enterprise, but was renamed five months before her launch in 1741.
  was an 8-gun sloop captured from the Spanish in 1743. She was employed solely in the Mediterranean as a dispatch vessel and tender, and was sold in 1748 at Minorca.
She was renamed Enterprise in 1744 as a 44-gun fifth rate and was broken up in 1771.
  was a 28-gun  sixth-rate frigate launched in August 1774, on harbour service from 1790 and broken up in 1807.
  was a 10-gun tender captured by the Americans in 1775, see USS Enterprise (1775).
Resource was rebuilt as a 22-gun floating battery in 1804, renamed Enterprise in 1806 and sold in 1816.
  was a wooden paddle gunvessel purchased in 1824 and in service until 1830.
  was a survey sloop launched in 1848, used as a coal hulk from 1860 and sold in 1903.
 HMS Enterprise was to have been a wooden screw sloop. She was laid down in 1861, renamed HMS Circassian in 1862 but cancelled in 1863.
  was an ironclad sloop ordered as HMS Circassian, but renamed in 1862.  She was launched in 1864 and sold in 1884.
  was an  light cruiser launched in 1919 and sold in 1946.
  was an  inshore survey ship launched in 1958 and sold in 1985.
  is an  multi-role survey vessel (hydrographic/oceanographic) launched in 2002 and currently in service.

Four other ships which served with the Royal Navy were also named Enterprise, but were not commissioned warships and so did not have the "HMS" prefix.
 Enterprise, was a British East India Company's armed paddle steamer that served alongside the Fleet in the First China War from 1839 to 1840 and the Second Burmese War in 1852.
 Enterprise, was an uncommissioned tugboat that was in service at Portsmouth Dockyard from 1899 to 1919 when she was renamed Emprise.  She continued to serve until 1947.
 Enterprise, was an uncommissioned auxiliary patrol anti-submarine net drifter with Harwich local forces from 1914 to 1918.
 Enterprise II, was an uncommissioned drifter, originally based at Larne but transferred to Italian waters in November 1915. In March 1916 she struck a naval mine off Brindisi and sank with eight casualties.

Battle honours
Ships named Enterprise have earned the following battle honours:
Atlantic, 1939−40
Norway, 1940
Biscay, 1943
Normandy, 1944

See also
 (HMS Enterprizing)
USS Enterprise (disambiguation)

Notes

References

Royal Navy ship names